Giovanni Pietro Ligario (1686–1748) was an Italian painter and architect of the late-Baroque.

He was born at Ardenno province of Sondrio in the Valtelline valley, and after early training there, moved to Rome, where he frequented the studio of  Lazzaro Baldi, and afterwards visited Venice. On his return to his native town in 1727, he was employed in painting historical pictures for churches and private collections. He died at Sondrio. He has left a  ‘‘St. Benedict’’ in the church of the convent at Sondrio, and a ‘‘Descent of the Holy Spirit’‘ in the church of San Giovanni Battista, Morbegno.

His children, Angelo, Cesare, and Vittoria were also painters.

References

External links

1686 births
1748 deaths
People from Sondrio
18th-century Italian architects
17th-century Italian painters
Italian male painters
18th-century Italian painters
Italian Baroque painters
Architects from Lombardy
18th-century Italian male artists